Etiquette refers to shared cultural norms governing individual behavior.

Etiquette may also refer to:

Arts, entertainment, and media
Etiquette (Casiotone for the Painfully Alone album), 2006
Etiquette (Something with Numbers album), 2004
Etiquette, one of the Bab Ballads by W. S. Gilbert
Etiquette in Society, in Business, in Politics, and at Home, a 1922 book by Emily Post

Other uses
Etiquette (technology), online etiquette 
Etiquette, labels applied to postal items, such as airmail etiquette